Maria Antònia Salvà i Ripoll (1869 – 1958) was a Mallorcan poet and translator, and the sister of the politician  and the painter . She was the first female poet in the Catalan language.

Considered the first modern poet in the Catalan language and the first modern translator, she is linked to the Renaixença in Mallorca. She wrote poems such as "Espigues en flor" (1926), "El retorn" (1934), and "Lluneta del pagès" (1952), as well as works in prose, such as Viatge a Orient (1907) and Entre el record i l'enyorança (1955).

Salvà was described as "a poet who disguised herself as a translator" to find meaning in the male poetry of her time. Her translations were popular, and still are, in particular her 1917 version of Frédéric Mistral's Mireia (1859).

Early life

Salvà was born on 4 November 1869 in Palma, the capital of the Balearic island of Mallorca. Her mother died when she was only a few months old, and Maria and her brother Antoni (b. 1868) were given to relatives in Llucmajor, while her eldest brother Francesc (b. 1867) was kept by their father and raised in Palma. From an early age, Salvà had a keen interest in poetry and language. In her memoir Between Memory and Longing she wrote: "My fondness for verse and songwriting could almost be said to be innate in me. My wet nurse, nicknamed Flauta, used to say that when I weaned, I already knew a string of songs".

At the age of six she met her father in Palma and was educated at the Col·legi de la Puresa. She began writing poems in Catalan at the age of 14 or 15; in these autobiographical poems, she shows an awareness of the exceptional nature with which she would have to experience writing in her youth and the first maturity of being a woman. At the age of sixteen she returned to Llucmajor, where she alternated between living at la Posada de la Llapassa (on Carrer Rei Jaume I in the town of Llucmajor) and at the la Llapassa estate. In Palma, however, her career grew through her father's acquaintances; she met with the intellectuals of the Renaixença in Mallorca and writers of Romantic poetry, including ,  and, above all, the Costa i Llobera and Ferrà families, who would impact her literary career. Miquel Costa i Llobera became her mentor.

Career
In 1893 she became well known in Catalan magazines and continued to write until the publication of her first collection, Poesies, in 1910. At this time, Salvà was introduced to the government through a young Josep Carner and her name was shared in publications about the new century. Salvà also began writing in prose – notably a diary about her trip to the Holy Land in 1907 with Costa i Llobera – and translating. She then became invariably linked to poet Frédéric Mistral thanks to her translations of the his works, especially Mireia (1917); these also made her the first literary translator of the modern era. She then expanded her translations into French and Italian. With this work, she was integrated into the Catalan literary corpus, along with figures like Francis Jammes, Alessandro Manzoni and Giovanni Pascoli.

In 1918, she received tribute in Palma from other Mallorcan writers and, presided over by Joan Alcover, joined with poets from other Catalan-speaking countries. Salvà's poetry is linked to a contemplation of the nature of her native landscape. Overcoming Franco's Catalan censorship, the  publishing house began to print her complete works in 1948. Salvà became a reference for the new generations who visited Llucmajor in the 1940s and '50s. In addition to Josep Carner, who considered her an extraordinary poetess and fought to share her work, her most intimate personal and literary interlocutor was  "in whom she had full, unlimited confidence".

Style

Other writers describe her style as having a tidy sensibility.  said that "it has been said that it cannot be by chance that the highest figure of the Mallorcan school [of language] is a woman. The taste for the reasons, for the tidy address, for the minor and delicate tone, united to the longing and inconcrete sensibility, is usually considered as a feminine quality. And this quality, typical of the school, substantially defines the poetry of Na Maria Antonia"; Carner said that her writing has "angelic tidiness, intimate complacency of everything in its place, with every emotion having a fitting and appropriate music. Maria Antònia brings us closer or more sensitized to that identification with beauty: splendor ordinis (the splendor of order) Traspua cel. her joy and her resentment and gives her voice a kind of caress and makes her spontaneity, nourished by select visions, occur in grace, and her stanzas, as the people would say, seem untouched".

 spoke about Salvà's style in terms of its subject and identity, saying that "it has no aesthetic ideology or intellectual pretensions. It is a poetry of the daily anecdote that links with ruralism, which has been a constant in Catalan literature since the Renaissance".

Catalan exceptionalism
Several years later in 1939 she briefly spoke in support of Francoism because of its religiosity.

Death
Salvà died at her childhood estate in Llucmajor on 29 January 1958 at the age of 88.

Literary work

Her work focuses especially on the landscape, but in the autobiographical poems she shows the awareness that her writing will be conditioned by the fact that she is a woman.

By 1893, progress had already been made in the condition of women. At the beginning of the industrial era, education was revalued and the work of women as educators of children was recognized. The role of the mother is dignified but at the same time she is placed in a dependent position, conceptualizing her as a loving being whose task is to love and sacrifice for her husband and family. The writers themselves accept this domestic role, they accept the fact that their writing will always occupy a secondary position in the face of household chores. With these restrictions, the environment admits the woman poet. Catalan writers seek consideration among the Catalan patricians of the Renaissance and often defend themselves this model of blessed and sweet woman (Maria Josepa Massanés, despite having been key in defending the intellectual emancipation of women, limits the benefits of female education in domesticity and pejoratively describes those who leave home for the pen in the exercise of their independence (profile embodied in the writer Aurore Dupin, known as George Sand) in her poem A la literata Agna Valldaura, Victòria Penya and Joaquima Santa Maria are also of this opinion, sharing it meant accepting the cultural circle formed mostly by educated and conservative Catholics, although it often meant the suffocation of the work itself. urged women to thank God for the ability to create poetry and not to seek personal vanity or to act in the public sphere, since their place is home where they will have "the warmth of love that in the family finds [the woman]. She lives there, next to her husband, surrounded by children".

Bibliography
 "Jocs de nins" (1903)
 Viatge a Orient (1907) Published in 1989
 Poesies (1910)
 Espigues en flor (1926)
 "La rosa dins la neu" (1931) (Jocs Florals de Barcelona, 1st runner-up for the :ca:Englantina d'or)
 "Mistral" (1932) (Jocs Florals de Barcelona)
 "De cara al pervindre. Mireio" (1932) (Jocs Florals de Barcelona)
 "El retorn" (1934)
 "Llepolies i joguines" (1946)
 "Cel d'horabaixa" (1948)
 "Lluneta del pagès" (1952)
 Entre el record i l'enyorança (1955), autobiography

Translations
 Frederic Mistral, "Les Illes d'or" (1910)
 Frederic Mistral, Mireia (1917)
 Andrée Bruguière de Gordot, "Dins les ruïnes d'Empúries. Sonets" (1918)
 Francis Jammes, "Les geòrgiques cristianes" (1918)
 Alessandro Manzoni, "Els promesos" (1923–24)
 Petrarca, Sis sonets de Petrarca en el VI Centenari del seu enamorament de Laura, 6 d'abril de 1327 (1928)
 Petrarca, In vita di madonna Laura. In morte di madonna Laura
 Santa Teresa de Jesús, Poemes de Santa Teresa de l'Infant Jesús (1945)
 Giovanni Pascoli, Poesies (1915–42) Published in 2002
 Poemes de Maria Antònia Salvà. Llibre de poemes orientat a infants amb il·lustracions de Pavla Reznicková publicat a El tinter dels clàssics. 21 Publicacions de l'Abadia de Montserrat (1990)
 She also translated Giosuè Carducci and Giacomo Leopardi in addition to numerous poetic compositions in various journals and those that remained unpublished, such as Pascoli's collection Poesies (2002).

See also
:ca:sa Llapassa
Cultural feminism

References

Further reading
 Bacardí, Montserrat i Godayol, Pilar. Traductores: de les disculpes a les afirmacions. Revista Literatures, 6, 2a època. ISSN 2013-6862 [in xarxa]
Escriure sense context. Jornades d'estudi de Maria Antònia Salvà (Palma-Llucmajor, 2-5 d'abril de 2008) Publicacions de l'Abadia de Montserrat.

External links
 Maria Antònia Salvà i Ripoll at Institució de les Lletres Catalanes (ILC).
 

1869 births
1958 deaths
19th-century Spanish poets
19th-century Spanish women writers
20th-century Spanish poets
20th-century Spanish women writers
Majorcan writers
People from Palma de Mallorca
Translators from French
Translators to Catalan